Long Lake National Wildlife Refuge, located in south-central North Dakota, was established in 1932 as a migratory bird refuge by President Herbert Hoover.

The shallow depths and lengths of meandering shoreline provide vast expanses of habitat that attract migrating and nesting species of waterfowl, shorebirds, and rare migrant birds. In recognition of the Refuge's significance in the ongoing effort to conserve wild birds and their habitat, Long Lake was designated as a "Globally Important Bird Area" in 2001. Also, due to the special importance of Long Lake National Wildlife Refuge to migrating shorebirds, the Refuge was recently recognized as a "Western Hemisphere Shorebird Reserve Network" site.

References
Refuge website 

Important Bird Areas of North Dakota
National Wildlife Refuges in North Dakota
Protected areas of Kidder County, North Dakota
Protected areas of Burleigh County, North Dakota
Protected areas established in 1932